CKRD-FM is a radio station that broadcasts a Christian format on the frequency 90.5 FM in Red Deer, Alberta, Canada.

Owned by Touch Canada Broadcasting (2006) Inc. (the general partner) and 1188011 Alberta Ltd. and Touch Canada Broadcasting Inc. (the limited partners), carrying on business as Touch Canada Broadcasting  Limited Partnership, the station received Canadian Radio-television and Telecommunications Commission on December 8, 2009.

The station uses the call letters previously used by the now CIZZ-FM from 1965 to 1987. What is now CHUB-FM was CKRD-AM from 1949 to 2000. The call sign was also originally used by the now-defunct television station CHCA-TV from 1965 to 2005.

References

External links
Shine 90.5 FM
 

KRD
KRD
Radio stations established in 1965
1965 establishments in Alberta